H. H. Holmes: America's First Serial Killer is a 2004 biographical documentary film directed by John Borowski. The film relates the true life story of American serial killer H. H. Holmes. Produced over a four-year period, the film highlights locations such as Holmes' childhood home in Gilmanton, New Hampshire, and the courtroom in Philadelphia where the "trial of the century" was held.

The film focuses on Dr. Holmes' entire life (1861–1896). It consists of  reenactments, expert interviews, and period photography. The film is narrated by Tony Jay.

Awards
Screamfest Horror Film Festival - 2004 - Best Horror Documentary
Midwest Independent Film Festival - 2003 Best Director, John Borowski for H. H. Holmes: America's First Serial Killer

References

External links

Reviews
Film Threat: Review
DVD Reviews by Andy McKeague
eFilmCritic.com: Review by Scott Weinberg

2004 films
2004 documentary films
2000s psychological thriller films
American documentary films
Documentary films about crime in the United States
Documentary films about serial killers
2000s English-language films
2000s American films